The Superior Dam is a hydroelectric barrage dam crossing the Huron River. It is located in Superior Township in Washtenaw County in the U.S. state of Michigan. It was completed in 1920 and currently provides hydroelectricity to the nearby city of Ann Arbor, which owns and maintains the dam and power station.

Description
The reservoir has no official name but is sometimes referred to as the Superior Pond or Superior Impoundment.

The reservoir and the downstream portion of the dam are open to the public, but there are no developed pathways or roads leading to the river at this point. Foot paths are cut through the woods leading to the west side of the river and the dam. The east side of the dam contains the hydroelectric plant and is not accessible to the public at any point. The crosswalk over the dam is also restricted.

The dam is one of four dams owned by the city of Ann Arbor. The other dams are the Geddes Dam, Argo Dam, and Barton Dam. Only Argo Dam and Barton Dam are actually within the city of Ann Arbor. Geddes Dam is within Ann Arbor Township.

Hydroelectricity
The Superior Station Hydroelectric Plant was constructed alongside the dam in 1920. The facility was built by the Detroit Edison Company. The generating station only provides a very small portion of Ann Arbor's energy supply. In 1957, the plant supplied 30 MW of power, just under 6% of the city's energy usage for the year. Most other energy sources came from near Detroit.  The Detroit Edison Company decommissioned the site in 1963 and sold it to the city of Ann Arbor. The city restored the facility and put it back into service in 1986. Soon after, the city entered into a 50-year contract to sell the energy back to the Detroit Edison Company to supply electricity for Ann Arbor's power grid.

Today, only the Superior Dam and Barton Dam have active hydroelectric facilities serving Ann Arbor. Combined, the two dams produce 6,000 Mwh of power annually to Ann Arbor.  There are currently four active hydroelectric dams along the Huron River: Barton, Superior, Ford Lake, and French Landing.

In a report published by the Huron River Watershed Council in 2019, they noted that the dam "does not generate enough electricity to cover its own annual maintenance and operating costs."

Activities

The area surrounding the Superior Dam is mostly undeveloped. It is a located along the Huron River Water Trail, mapped by the Huron–Clinton Metroparks system to provide information for canoes and kayaks.  The Superior Dam does not have its own parking lot, park facilities, or launch, and carrying a canoe or kayak to the site is impractical. For boaters travelling down the Huron River, there is a small dock and portage, as well as improved terrain to allow portaging the dam and continuing along the river.

The city of Ann Arbor owns the dam and the surrounding area, but the city sees little demand for converting the area into a recreational facility on par with other riverfront parks. While the city owns the dam and reservoir, most of the land surrounding it is privately-owned Superior Township property. The area is remote and has no road access. The rowing conditions along the river at this point are not good enough to draw in large numbers of boaters, especially with very low bridge clearances and a lack of public amenities.

The Superior Dam and its reservoir are accessible for shore fisherman. Common fish caught along this stretch of the river include small and largemouth bass, sunfish, rock bass, northern pike, crappie, and carp.

Health concerns
The Huron River is occasionally issued a "do not eat" fish advisory by the Michigan Department of Health and Human Services when the waters accumulate high levels of cyanobacteria and perfluorooctanesulfonatecan (PFOS). When this bacteria is present, prolonged contact with the water is not advised, although occasional contact with PFOS is not considered a health concern.  When the advisory is in place, fishermen are advised to catch and release only, and warning signs are posted at river access points. While the Superior Dam and its reservoir are not specifically mentioned, the advisory is often issued for long stretches of the Huron River that include the Superior Dam portion of the river.

References

Buildings and structures in Washtenaw County, Michigan
Hydroelectric power plants in Michigan
Huron River (Michigan)
Dams in Michigan
Dams completed in 1920
Energy infrastructure completed in 1920
1920 establishments in Michigan